Nguyễn Văn Linh (1 July 1915 – 27 April 1998) was a Vietnamese revolutionary and politician. Nguyễn Văn Linh was the general secretary of the Communist Party of Vietnam from 1986 to 1991 and a political leader of the Vietcong during the Vietnam War. During his time in office, Linh was a strong advocate of "Đổi Mới" (renovation), an economic plan whose aim is to turn Vietnam economy to a socialist-oriented market economy. As such, Linh was often touted as the "Vietnamese Gorbachev" after the Soviet leader, who introduced Perestroika.

Biography
Nguyễn Văn Linh was born in Hưng Yên on 1 July 1915. His original name was Nguyễn Văn Cúc, he would later adopt Nguyễn Văn Linh as his nom de guerre. At age 14, Linh became involved in underground communist movement against French colonial rule, joining the Ho Chi Minh Communist Youth Union. In 1930 at the age of sixteen, Linh was arrested and incarcerated until 1936 for distributing leaflets directed against the French. After his release, he joined the Communist Party of Vietnam. He was sent to Saigon, in the southern part of the country to help establish party cells, causing him to be detained again from 1941 to 1945. In 1945, Vietnam declared its independence from French rule and the First Indochina War ensued. Meanwhile, Linh rose in the party hierarchy becoming a member of the Central Committee in 1960.

During the Vietnam War, Nguyễn Văn Linh was the party secretary for the Vietcong in South Vietnam, which had seen him direct the guerrilla resistance against the American-allied government there, but most of his duties were organizational rather than military. He also specialised in propaganda, studying and attempting to influence American politics in favour of North Vietnam. He trained special undercover Vietcong spies who infiltrated government organisations in Saigon. In 1968, Linh directed the Tet Offensive against South Vietnam. This surprise attack throughout most South Vietnamese towns and cities was a turning point of the Vietnam War. After the end of the Vietnam War and the re-unification of Vietnam in 1975, Linh was inducted to the Communist Party's Politburo and became party chief of the capital Saigon. He favoured a slow transformation of the formerly capitalist southern part of the country causing him to come into conflict with his party colleagues. In the late 1970s, though considered a promising party politician, he had repeated arguments with Lê Duẩn, Ho Chi Minh's successor as party leader, preventing him from rising further in the hierarchy. In 1982, he was even removed from the Politburo. According to his friends, Linh resigned after an argument over the future of South Vietnam, in which he defended private capital.

In the mid-1980s the Vietnamese economy experienced crisis, making a more liberal, market-based economy more of a sensible option to many politicians. This led to Linh's being re-instated in the Politburo in 1985 (and Permanent Secretariat 1986), under the direction of General Secretary Trường Chinh draft political report and even being made party general secretary the following year. Immediately, he started reforming Vietnam's economy. He was elected General Secretary in the immediate aftermath of the 6th National Congress. Renouncing the ideological decisions that he claimed had caused the problems, he allowed private enterprise and market prices and disbanded agricultural collectives. This change in policy was dubbed Doi Moi, a Vietnamese term meaning renovation. In the political sphere, Linh tried to improve relations with both the United States and China. In 1990, he secretly visited China, becoming the first Vietnamese leader to do so since the 1979 Sino-Vietnamese War. In 1989, he ordered the withdrawal of Vietnamese troops from Cambodia, where they had been sent to remove Pol Pot's Khmer Rouge regime. However, as far as domestic policy is concerned, Linh felt there was little need for change. "It is not objectively necessary to establish a political mechanism of pluralism and multiparty government," he stated, while always referring to Western-style democratic systems as "demagogic bourgeois democracies". He criticised the old communist policies, blaming them on corrupt leaders. Thus, Linh's policies were the constant target of criticism from the more conservative elements in the Communist Party. Linh stepped down as party leader in 1991 at the 7th National Congress, having announced his withdrawal a year before. His poor health was cited as the cause, as he had been hospitalised for what is suspected to have been a stroke in 1989, but political rivalries probably also played into his decision. He was succeeded by Đỗ Mười, a supporter of Linh's reforms.

He was Advisor of the Party's Central Committee from 1991 to December 1997. Starting with a surprising speech at the 7th National Congress of the Communist Party of Vietnam and then series of letters to the country's newspapers, Linh eventually renounced the effects of his own policies, accusing foreign investors of exploiting his native country and harming socialism. He attacked the growing gap between the rich and the poor and accused American companies of dumping goods on the country rather than helping it with investments and technology. He then wrote a regular newspaper column called "Things That Must Be Done Immediately" attacking corruption and incompetence among the Vietnamese political elite. Linh died of liver cancer on 27 April 1998, in Ho Chi Minh City. He was 82.

Contributions to Vietnam
Nguyễn Văn Linh had charted the evolution of the reforms of the party organization. Scholars argue that Linh's contributions and importance in reform gave a very detailed and clear analysis of his program to reform the Vietnam communist party within the wider context of Đổi Mới. Linh showed flexibility and adaptability with an inclination for the unorthodox spin to policy making. Scholars like Stern see that Linh relied less on mobilizational instruments, campaigns exhortations, symbols and more on bureaucratically co-ordinated programmes. He was able to utilize unique combinations of resources to attack specific party related problems, often relying on media and selected mass organizations to propel his reformist ideologies. Linh was critical in steering plenary sessions of the Central committee to take more importance in decision process where competing views of economic policies and fundamental political issues were discussed. Stern argued this was possible, in large part due to Linh's open, flexible, innovative and unconventional mode of operation within the Vietnamese bureaucracy which showed Linh's importance in how he managed politics to contribute towards reform.

Under Linh, effort was made to make the party more responsible and accountable for policies and personnel choices which was a strong factor in the success of economic reform. Stern suggested that it was Nguyễn Văn Linh himself who was most important in the biggest part to play in Vietnam's economic reforms. He suggested that Linh's position and foresight was that economic reforms should be done gradually and steadily without causing political instability or creating opportunities for negative elements to create trouble. Linh also allowed flexibility and local initiative for issues of parallel political and economic renovation which sheds light for scholars to compare Linh's style and contributions to other key leaders in the current narrative. Linh also could be seen to have also got to where he was with self promotion more than what he was able to do. This opens up avenues for us to question and consider if any other contenders then might actually be equally important in the grand scheme of Vietnam's economic renovation. Some might contend that Linh achieved some initial and limited success in making the party responsive to the altered political playing field and could not push past the conservative majority and his own political beliefs to welcome true change in the Vietnamese political landscape. This view carries quite a generic stance on Linh amongst the scholarship published and if Linh truly had been a conservative the above categories would then be problematic in accessing his true legacy and contributions. Scholarship in some parts also acknowledges that Võ Văn Kiệt as one of the important key proponents of the reform programme. In this aspect we have to calibrate our understanding to consider Võ Văn Kiệt’s contributions with both perspectives included.

Being the Brains of Đổi Mới
Nguyễn Văn Linh could also be seen as the nominal brains of Đổi Mới but was publicly horrified by his results of his own inspirations. He was also at one point especially hostile toward Võ Văn Kiệt by publicly accusing Võ Văn Kiệt of corruption even when they had once been close allies. 

While Linh publicly took an even stronger position in favor of a grassroots movement "to help the party correct, rectify, and overcome its shortcomings in the earlier years, some might consider that it was Võ Văn Kiệt who opined in 1995 that businessmen should be encouraged to succeed for the economy by understanding the economics of business. Võ Văn Kiệt’s actions led others to consider him as a key architect of the market revolution since its inception. In considering the narratives of both persons, it is important to note that that Võ Văn Kiệt and his allies might have used ideologies, whether called socialist or market as practical tools to advance their own strategic objectives and power. An objective way to weigh perspectives would be to understand that these members also ultimately wanted power to their advantage and this added another dimension in analysing how one worked towards contributing along with his true agenda balanced. Apart from these it is also important to know how sources might not always give us the full story.

Another method of analysing Linh's contributions
The harsh realities and economic crisis were both not necessary or sufficient conditions for the reform fully take place but it was the entrepreneurial process which saw structural changes and later kicked off innovation in Vietnam. While Linh had contributed to the process of Đổi Mới by restructuring the economy nationwide, working on investment and allocation of financial resources to increase efficiency and effectiveness of policies and the economy. Linh’s activeness in key military and key diplomatic activities as efficient in improving the standing of Vietnam and aiding his decision making process during the reforms. He was also responsible for economic reform successes and not the same reasons Linh himself had claimed, thereby creating "another method” in considering Linh's contributions and legacy. As the policies of Nguyen Van Linh were adopted at the 6th Congress, Vietnam slowly transformed into a market economy which brought success to the reform. These were key evidences towards the assessments of the Nguyen Van Linh narrative in considering his contributions in the renovation, modernisation and industrialization of Vietnam which made him a responsible contributor.

In another perspective, Võ Văn Kiệt could perhaps also be seen as being one of the key respected leaders had tried to work with numerous directors of nationally owned enterprises in hopes to promote better reforms in a larger scale without subverting party hierarchies by not uprooting the leadership but allowing the party to change its mind to slowly come to a new consensus. Võ Văn Kiệt had also implicitly approved using the economic model of North Vietnam across the nation but later found problems with the growth model from his experiences in Ho Chi Minh city, driving him towards the key leaders in “fence breaking” experiments in the lead up towards the 6th Party Congress. This also paints Kiệt in different dimensions where he was willing to reflect on his own policies and make adaptations to ensure what was best for the nation, a key trait and contribution towards Vietnam's economic successes.

Võ Văn Kiệt had supported the authorization of establishing credit cooperatives, foreign bank branches and the join stocks bank to separate budgetary functions away from central bank functions in reforming the economy a key step which cannot be ignored. Being the first deputy Prime Minister then, he was game in taking an unprecedented method in setting up two key independent specialist expert groups to conduct research and studies on the matter. He was adept in using the advice from both groups and combined the best ideas to develop an ordinance on the banking sector, to his credit, he later also created a department responsible for mobilizing intellectual resources from the former regime in the South. All of these contributions reflect his forward looking attitudes and areas which would later become important contribution towards Vietnam's successful ongoing reform process.

Linh had also been described as “having earned a reputation as a reformer” during Linh's time as party secretary of Ho Chi Minh city after 1975. Linh penned articles to give weight to reform experiments where experimentation of policies was allowed before such practices were sanctioned in his critical role to the state. However, one might also see Võ Văn Kiệt as the southerner reformer who placed himself to critics of central government policies in the South by supporting innovative economic schemes. Linh could also be seen as a third group of leaders who were similar in age to the second generation leaders (but joined earlier and hence promoted earlier to where they were). While Linh was widely trumpeted as an economic reformer, he was actually as capable as anyone in tightening the screw of politics. This provided another perspective as to how capable and important Linh was. In addition, Võ Văn Kiệt had also been well recognized as a champion of Vietnam reforms even when he lacked formal western training and should not be considered young even by a more relaxed standards of East Asian countries. 

Historians are also able to consider if it was a handover and collaborative effort where the right people were at the right place to reform Vietnam at the same time challenges the main narrative of Nguyễn Văn Linh's contributions to consider the role of leaders greatly provided insight towards this research. In making an objective analysis of Linh, it seemed apparent that application of postmodernism analysis in historical figures along with critical interpretation and objectivity based on the context and how knowledge of history has unfolded or evolved allows us to get a clearer picture.

References

External links
 Vietnam: Urgent Problems, a 1988 collection of his speeches in PDF format

1915 births
1998 deaths
General Secretaries of the Central Committee of the Communist Party of Vietnam
Members of the 4th Politburo of the Communist Party of Vietnam
Members of the 5th Politburo of the Communist Party of Vietnam
Members of the 6th Politburo of the Communist Party of Vietnam
Members of the 4th Secretariat of the Communist Party of Vietnam
Members of the 5th Secretariat of the Communist Party of Vietnam
Members of the 6th Secretariat of the Communist Party of Vietnam
Members of the 5th Central Committee of the Communist Party of Vietnam
Members of the 6th Central Committee of the Communist Party of Vietnam
People from Quảng Ngãi province
Vietnamese nationalists
Vietnamese revolutionaries
Deaths from cancer in Vietnam
Deaths from liver cancer